Pauline Margrete Hall (2 August 1890 – 24 January 1969) was a Norwegian composer and music critic. She was the founding chairwoman of Ny Musikk (1938–1961) and served as president of the International Society for Contemporary Music (1952–1953).

Background
Pauline  Hall was born at Hamar in Hedmark, Norway. She was the daughter of Isak Muus Hall (1849–1914) and Magdalena Catharina Agersborg (1854–1934). Her father was a  pharmacist who operated several pharmacies in Hamar, at Kabelvåg in Lofoten and in Tromsø.

From 1908 she studied piano with composer and pianist  Johan Backer Lunde  (1874–1958) in Kristiania (now Oslo). From 1910 to 1912 she studied the theory and composition of  classical composers with music educator Catharinus Elling. She also had a study stay in Paris from 1912 to 1914.

Career

Hall's debut as a composer came in 1917 with a full-length concert evening in Oslo featuring solely her works. Hall was initially known as a composer of romances, but today her orchestral works, and in particular 1929's Verlaine Suite, stand out as centerpieces of her compositional output. French impressionism and literature would prove to be key sources of inspiration for Hall, an influx that would not necessarily resonate well with the prevailing national romanticism sentiment of 1930s Norway. Throughout her compositional career, Hall would find it challenging to introduce new stylistic impulses to the Norwegian music scene.

In addition to her orchestral output, Hall also composed a number of choral works and music for stage productions. Theatre remained close to her heart, and Hall translated a number of major works into Norwegian including Igor Stravinsky’s Soldier’s Tale and Arthur Honegger’s Le Roi David. In 1930, she translated, staged and directed The Threepenny Opera (Die Dreigroschenoper) by Bertolt Brecht and Kurt Weill.  Hall also served as  instructor and conductor for its Oslo premiere.

She wrote music for radio and started Pauline Hall's vocal quintet in 1932. From 1934 to 1964, she worked as  music critic for the Oslo daily newspaper Dagbladet. Hall was known for criticism of dilettantism and superficial national composers and her promotion of modern music.

In 1938 she was the founding chairwoman of   Ny Musikk, the Norwegian section of the International Society for Contemporary Music (ISCM). She also served as president of ISCM International from 1952–53, and took over management of the ISCM International Music Festival in Oslo in 1953. She served as chair of Ny Musikk  until 1961 when she was succeeded by composer Finn Mortensen.

Personal life
Pauline Hall received the King's Medal of Merit (Kongens fortjenstmedalje) in gold in 1938. She died in Oslo and was buried at Vestre gravlund.

Selected works
Hall composed orchestral works, theater and film music, chamber music and vocal works. Selected compositions include:
1929 Verlaine Suite, for orchestra
1933 Cirkusbilleder, for orchestra
1949 Suite av scenemusikken til «Julius Caesar» på Nationaltheateret, for orchestra
Foxtrott, for orchestra
1950 Markisen, ballet, première: 1964, Oslo, Den Norske Opera
1947 Ro ro te rara, for male choir
En gutt gikk ut på elskovssti, for male choir, text: Gunnar Larsen
Nachtwandler, for 6 part mixed choir and orchestra, text: Falke
Til kongen, for mixed choir
To Wessel-tekster, for male choir, op. 7, text: Johan Herman Wessel
1945 Fangens aftensang, for voice and piano
1961 Fire Tosserier, for voice, clarinet, bassoon, trumpet and French horn
Du blomst i dug, for voice and piano, text: Iens Petter Jacobsen
Rondeau, for voice and piano, text: E. Solstad
Tagelied, for voice and orchestra
Tango, for voice and orchestra
To sanger, for voice and piano, op. 4, text: Knut Hamsun Auerdahl
1945 Suite, for wind quintet
Liten dansesuite, for oboe, clarinet and bassoon

Her music has been recorded and issued on CD, including:
Pauline Hall: Verlaine Suite/Julius Caesar Suite/Suite for Winds/4 Tosserier (June 26, 2007) Simax Records/Premiere, ASIN: B000027ALU

References

Other sources

External links

 List of works supplied by the National Library of Norway
Ny Musikk website

1890 births
1969 deaths
Musicians from Hamar
Norwegian classical composers
Norwegian music critics
Norwegian women critics
Norwegian women non-fiction writers
20th-century classical composers
Norwegian women composers
Recipients of the King's Medal of Merit in gold
Burials at Vestre gravlund
20th-century women composers
20th-century Norwegian women